RNA Automation, a member of Rhein-Nadel Automation, was established in Birmingham UK, in 1986, and has progressed into becoming the major supplier of parts handling equipment in the UK. The company operates in the area of specialized Automation engineering, providing automatic parts handling equipment for high volume production in the cosmetics, pharmaceutical, electronics, food and metal working industries, with seven manufacturing facilities across Europe and North America and a network of sales and service outlets across the globe.

Company history
Founded in 1972, Rhein-Nadel Automation is the market leader throughout Europe and operates worldwide in parts handling technology. Rhein-Nadel Automation is a member of the Rheinnadel Group, which has been based since 1898 in the city of Aachen, Germany. Rhein-Nadel Automation have four manufacturing sites in Germany and individual manufacturing plants in the UK, Spain and Switzerland, together with a world-wide, decentralized distribution and service network with 28 subsidiaries.

Time line
1968 The department of the needle factory, so far only responsible for the internal construction of operating materials and machines, trades under the name Rheinnadel Maschinenbau and begins working for external customers.

1972 Rheinnadel Maschinenbau now also uses the firm name Rhein-Nadel Automation GmbH and concentrates exclusively on the area of Feeding Technology.

19801989 Rhein-Nadel Automation expands. The permanent establishment in Ergolding and the subsidiaries in Switzerland and Great Britain are found.

19901999 Rhein-Nadel Automation continues to grow. The Spanish company Vibrant S.A. is purchased.

2000 With RNA Automated Systems Inc., the first subsidiary outside of Europe to take up its commercial activities in Canada.

2004 The Rheinnadel Group concentrates its activities on the area of Automation. RNA broadens its range with the components and continues to extend its development capacities.

RNA Automation specializes in automated feeder and specialist handling systems, offering vibratory bowl feeders, Linear Feeders, Centrifugal Feeders and Step Feeder systems. RNA also supplies a range of specialist handling equipment, including Vision Guided Robots, Tablet Inspection, Vision Inspection, Tray Loading, and Bottle Handling.

Technology 
RNA supplies a range of vibratory http://www.rna-uk.com/, centrifugal feeders, linear and conveyor feed systems, and hopper elevator systems in different formats. RNA bowl tops and drive units are designed to work in harmony alongside each other and handle components from all areas of industry, providing the widest possible range of shapes and sizes made of any kind of material that can be catered for.

In association with Hoppmann Corporation, RNA offers a full range of tooled centrifugal feeders. The centrifugal feeder systems can be interfaced and supplied as a complete packaging line with further production transportation via downstream conveyor systems to subsequent packaging operations such as capping, labelling, flow wrapping, and cartoning machines.

The RNA Step Feeder is a compact, low-noise alternative to a bowl feeding system, and in many circumstances, components can be tooled without the aid of air. The RNA step feeder is manufactured in such a way that the static hopper, which has a very low filling height, can be loaded manually. The components are collected from the hopper by elevating plates, pre-sorted, and fed to the top without any further feeding technique until they reach the desired transfer height.

Directional Carpet Linear feeders are developed to orient components where a step feeder or bowl feeder is not suitable They enable gentle handling of oriented components from bulk to escapement devices, creating product accumulation prior to a machine or handling unit. Large heavy and bulky components contaminated with oil or swarf can be oriented and conveyed to a machine using a carpet feeder.

Specialist handling
RNA are the sole agents in the UK and Ireland for the SVIA range of Vision Guided Robotic Systems. All systems have a Robotic arm for handling and manipulating the product, a camera system, and share the same PC-based control system and are, in most cases, integrated with a standard ABB robot controller.

RNA, alongside camera specialists Machine Vision Technology, has developed a tablet inspection system to inspect and sort tablets up to and over 1000 parts per minute. The specification of a tablet inspection system is as follows:

A 600mm diameter vibratory bowl feeder in stainless steel and a variable speed controller. A speed of 8001000 tablets per minute Outputs onto a conveyor with a reject sort facility. With up to four double-speed progressive scan cameras and lighting mounted along the conveyor, A high-speed PC with a 17-inch LCD display mounted in a SS enclosure. The system is designed to meet pharmaceutical standards The software complies with FDA requirements. All documentation is to CFR 21 pt. 11, with the fully validated version option.

References
 SVIA Industrial Automation
 www.rnaautomation.com/ Company website
 Rhein-Nadel Automation Company website
 Learn about Robots-Industrial Robots

Manufacturing companies based in Birmingham, West Midlands
Industrial robots